Polynoncus burmeisteri is a species of hide beetle in the subfamily Omorginae found in Argentina.

References

burmeisteri
Beetles described in 1987